In mathematics and physics, vector is a term that refers colloquially to some quantities that cannot be expressed by a single number (a scalar), or to elements of some vector spaces.

Historically, vectors were introduced in geometry and physics (typically in mechanics) for quantities that have both a magnitude and a direction, such as displacements, forces and velocity. Such quantities are represented by geometric vectors in the same way as distances, masses and time are represented by real numbers.

The term vector is also used, in some contexts, for tuples, which are finite sequences of numbers of a fixed length.

Both geometric vectors and tuples can be added and scaled, and these vector operations led to the concept of a vector space, which is a set equipped with a vector addition and a scalar multiplication that satisfy some axioms generalizing the main properties of operations on the above sorts of vectors. A vector space formed by geometric vectors is called a Euclidean vector space, and a vector space formed by tuples is called a coordinate vector space.

Many vector spaces are considered in mathematics, such as extension field, polynomial rings, algebras and function spaces. The term vector is generally not used for elements of these vectors spaces, and is generally reserved for geometric vectors, tuples, and elements of unspecified vector spaces (for example, when discussing general properties of vector spaces).

Vectors in Euclidean geometry

Vector spaces

Vectors in algebra
Every algebra over a field is a vector space, but elements of an algebra are generally not called vectors. However, in some cases, they are called vectors, mainly due to historical reasons.
 Vector quaternion, a quaternion with a zero real part
 Multivector or -vector, an element of the exterior algebra of a vector space.
 Spinors, also called spin vectors, have been introduced for extending the notion of rotation vector. In fact, rotation vectors represent well rotations locally, but not globally, because a closed loop in the space of rotation vectors may induce a curve in the space of rotations that is not a loop. Also, the manifold of rotation vectors is orientable, while the manifold of rotations is not. Spinors are elements of a vector subspace of some Clifford algebra.
 Witt vector, an infinite sequence of elements of a commutative ring, which belongs to an algebra over this ring, and has been introduced for handling carry propagation in the operations on p-adic numbers.

Data represented by vectors

The set  of tuples of  real numbers has a natural structure of vector space defined by component-wise addition and scalar multiplication. It is common to call these tuples vectors, even in contexts where vector-space operations do not apply. More generally, when some data can be represented naturally by vectors, they are often called vectors even when addition and scalar multiplication of vectors are not valid operations on these data. Here are some examples.
 Rotation vector, a Euclidean vector whose direction is that of the axis of a rotation and magnitude is the angle of the rotation. 
 Burgers vector, a vector that represents the magnitude and direction of the lattice distortion of dislocation in a crystal lattice
 Interval vector, in musical set theory, an array that expresses the intervallic content of a pitch-class set
 Probability vector, in statistics, a vector with non-negative entries that sum to one. 
 Random vector or multivariate random variable, in statistics, a set of real-valued random variables that may be correlated. However, a random vector may also refer to a random variable that takes its values in a vector space.
 Logical vector, a vector of 0s and 1s (Booleans).

See also

 Vector (disambiguation)

Vector spaces with more structure
 Graded vector space, a type of vector space that includes the extra structure of gradation
 Normed vector space, a vector space on which a norm is defined
 Hilbert space
 Ordered vector space, a vector space equipped with a partial order
 Super vector space, name for a Z2-graded vector space
 Symplectic vector space, a vector space V equipped with a non-degenerate, skew-symmetric, bilinear form
 Topological vector space, a blend of topological structure with the algebraic concept of a vector space

Vector fields
A vector field is a vector-valued function that, generally, has a domain of the same dimension (as a manifold) as its codomain,
 Conservative vector field, a vector field that is the gradient of a scalar potential field
 Hamiltonian vector field, a vector field defined for any energy function or Hamiltonian
 Killing vector field, a vector field on a Riemannian manifold
 Solenoidal vector field, a vector field with zero divergence
 Vector potential, a vector field whose curl is a given vector field
 Vector flow, a set of closely related concepts of the flow determined by a vector field

Miscellaneous
 Ricci calculus
 Vector Analysis, a textbook on vector calculus by Wilson, first published in 1901, which did much to standardize the notation and vocabulary of three-dimensional linear algebra and vector calculus
 Vector bundle, a topological construction that makes precise the idea of a family of vector spaces parameterized by another space
 Vector calculus, a branch of mathematics concerned with differentiation and integration of vector fields
 Vector differential, or del, a vector differential operator represented by the nabla symbol 
 Vector notation, common notation used when working with vectors
 Vector operator, a type of differential operator used in vector calculus
 Vector product, or cross product, an operation on two vectors in a three-dimensional Euclidean space, producing a third three-dimensional Euclidean vector
 Vector projection, also known as vector resolute or vector component, a linear mapping producing a vector parallel to a second vector
 Vector-valued function, a function that has a vector space as a codomain
 Vectorization (mathematics), a linear transformation that converts a matrix into a column vector
 Vector autoregression, an econometric model used to capture the evolution and the interdependencies between multiple time series
 Vector boson, a boson with the spin quantum number equal to 1
 Vector measure, a function defined on a family of sets and taking vector values satisfying certain properties
 Vector meson, a meson with total spin 1 and odd parity
 Vector quantization, a quantization technique used in signal processing
 Vector soliton, a solitary wave with multiple components coupled together that maintains its shape during propagation
 Vector synthesis, a type of audio synthesis
 Phase vector

Notes

References 

Broad-concept articles